The 2017 Dorset County Council election took place on 4 May 2017 as part of the 2017 local elections in the United Kingdom. All 46 councillors were elected from 40 electoral divisions, which returned either one or two county councillors each by first-past-the-post voting for a four-year term of office.

Boundary changes to the electoral divisions, saw an increase in councillors from 45 to 46 and decrease in electoral wards from 42 to 40, took effect at this election after a review of the county by the Local Government Boundary Commission for England.

Election result summary

Election result by division

Beaminster

Blackmore Vale

Blandford Forum

Bridport

Broadwey

Burton Grange

Chickerell and Chesil Bank

Christchurch Central

Colehill East and Stapehill

Colehill West and Wimborne Minster

Commons

Corfe Mullen

Cranborne Chase

Dorchester

Ferndown

Gillingham

Hambledon

Linden Lea

Lodmoor

Lytchett Minster and Upton

Marshwood Vale

Moors

Mudeford and Highcliffe

North West Purbeck

Portland Harbour

Portland Tophill

Rodwell

Shaftesbury

Sherborne Rural

Sherborne Town

South Purbeck

Stalbridge and The Beacon

Swanage

Three Valleys

Verwood

Walkford

Wareham

Westham

Weymouth Town

Winterborne

References

2017
2017 English local elections
2010s in Dorset